Clear Creek is a stream in Boone County in the U.S. state of Missouri. It is a tributary of Little Bonne Femme Creek.

The confluence is south of Columbia within the boundary of the Rock Bridge Memorial State Park adjacent to Missouri Route 163.

Clear Creek was descriptively named on account of its clear water.

See also
List of rivers of Missouri

References

Rivers of Boone County, Missouri
Rivers of Missouri